Rhiannon Lassiter (born February 1977) is a children's books author.

Biography
Rhiannon Lassiter was born on 9 February 1977 in London to children's books author Mary Hoffman and Stephen Barber.

She started writing the first book of the Hex trilogy, set in a totalitarian futuristic Europe, when she was seventeen, and sent the first chapters to Douglas Hill (a friend of the family) and Pat White (her mother's agent). She was stunned when Pat wrote back saying that she loved it and would like to represent Rhiannon and Douglas said she should send it to his editor, Marion Lloyd, at Macmillan. Macmillan accepted the first two Hex books shortly after her nineteenth birthday.

As well as writing she also runs her own web-design business, writes articles and reviews of children's books and is part of the production team of Armadillo, her mother's children's books review publication.

Selected works

Books
 Little Witches Bewitched (2013)
 Ghost of a Chance (2010)
 Bad Blood (August 2007)
 Roundabout (2006)
 Rights of Passage: Shadowland (January 2005)
 Super Zeroes (July 2005)
 Rights of Passage: Outland (October 2004)
 Lines in the Sand (June 2003)
 Rights of Passage: Borderland (June 2003)
 Waking Dream (2002)
 Hex: Ghosts (2000)
 The Supernatural (1999)
 Hex: Shadows (1999)
 Hex (1998)

Short stories
 Walking the Wire (1999)
 White Walls (1997)

See also
Rhiannon Lassiter's home page
Interview of Rhiannon Lassiter by ACHUKA—Children's Books UK

References

1977 births
Living people
British people of Indian descent
British women novelists
British writers of young adult literature